The Pontiac Sunfire is a compact car by Pontiac that was introduced for the 1995 model year to replace the Sunbird. Not only was the name changed, but dramatic styling changes were included as well. The new styling was shared with the redesigned Chevrolet Cavalier. The J platform was updated structurally to meet more stringent safety standards for the 1996 model year.

The Pontiac Sunfire went through two facelifts in its 11-year run: a small redesign in 2000 featuring the heavy plastic cladding look that was prevalent with Pontiac at the time, and a more streamlined update in 2003.  In the US, the coupe was the only model available from 2003 to 2005. The sedan continued to be sold in Canada and Mexico until the end of production on June 22, 2005.  GM replaced the Sunfire with the G5 for the 2006 model year in Canada and the 2007 model year in the United States.

Technical 
 1995 –  Quad 4 (RPO: LD2) I4, 150 hp (116 kW) and 
 1995–1997 –  2200 (RPO: LN2) I4,  and 
 1998–2002 –  2200 (RPO: LN2) I4,  and 
 1996–2002 –  Twin Cam (RPO: LD9) I4,  and 
 2002–2005 –  Ecotec (RPO: L61) I4,  and 

The base model had the 2.2 L engine from 1994 until 2002. The GT trim level had an optional, more powerful 2.3 L Quad 4 engine from 1994–1995, which was replaced by the 2.4 L LD9 engine in 1995. The 2.3 and 2.4 litre engines were optional in the 2 and 4 door LS trim level. In 2003, both the 2.2 L and the 2.4 L engines were replaced by the 2.2 L Ecotec engine, and would be the only powertrain available for the remainder of production.  The Ecotec engine was also an option for the 2002 model year.

At the time of introduction, the Sunfire was available with a three-speed automatic or a five-speed manual. General Motors had envisioned introducing a new four-speed automatic with the new car, but the company's cash shortage delayed this option until the next year.

Trim levels
The Sunfire could be purchased as a sedan, coupe, or convertible.  All three variations came in the standard SE trim level.  An upscale GT trim level was available on the coupe and convertible. The GT trim level came standard with the 2.3 litre LD2 engine from 1994 to 1995 or the 2.4 litre LD9 "Twin Cam" engine (1996–2002), 16-inch alloy wheels, dual exhaust, and a more aggressive looking front fascia.  The SE trim was the standard for the Sunfire which included the 2.2 litre 2200 OHV Engine.  The 2.3/2.4 DOHC Engine was optional.  Both the SE and GT trim levels were dropped after the 2002 model year, along with the 2.2 OHV and 2.4 DOHC engines.  The 2.2 litre Ecotec was the only available engine as of the 2002 model year.

Originally, the convertible was only in the SE trim level until the 1999 model year where it became only available in the GT trim.  The convertible was discontinued after the 2000 model year. All Sunfire convertibles were assembled at the "Genesis" Lansing, Michigan Plant. At its introduction from 1995 until 2001 the rear of the vehicle on coupes has the brand name "Pontiac" between the tail lights, and the trim panel is backlit when the vehicle is on using license plate bulbs installed in the trunk. As vehicles are passed from one owner to another, the panel is not illuminated due to the owners not being aware of the feature.

Prices in 1995 Range from A base sedan at $10,243, all the way to a $14,195 coupe GT . In 2005 The Pontiac Sunfire had a base price of $15,205 .

References

External links 

General Motors Sport Compact Forums
The J-body Organization

Compact cars
Front-wheel-drive vehicles
Sunfire
Coupés
Convertibles
Sedans
Cars introduced in 1994
2000s cars
Vehicles built in Lansing, Michigan
Motor vehicles manufactured in the United States